The name Goring has been used for 13 tropical cyclones in the Philippines by PAGASA in the Western Pacific.

 Severe Tropical Storm Carla (1965) (T6508, 10W, Goring) – a strong typhoon that was only considered by JMA as a severe tropical storm; brushed northern Philippines and Japan
 Severe Tropical Storm Winnie (1969) (T6906, 06W, Goring) – hit extreme northern Philippines
 Severe Tropical Storm Kate (1973) (T7312, 13W, Goring) – struck Hainan and northern Vietnam
 Typhoon Thelma (1977) (T7704, 06W, Goring) – struck the Philippines and Taiwan
 Tropical Depression Goring (1981) – short-lived tropical depression only recognized by PAGASA
 Typhoon Jeff (1985) (T8507, 07W, Goring) – struck China
 Typhoon Gordon (1989) (T8908, 08W, Goring) – struck the Philippines and China
 Typhoon Koryn (1993) (T9303. 06W, Goring) – struck the Philippines and China
 Typhoon Victor (1997) (T9712, 13W, Goring) – struck China
 Typhoon Wipha (2007) (T0712, 13W, Goring) – struck China
 Tropical Depression Goring (2011) – weak system that was only monitored by JMA and PAGASA
 Typhoon Halola (2015) (T1512, 01C, Goring) – developed in the Central Pacific Basin and made landfall over Kyushu
 Tropical Depression Goring (2019) – a tropical depression that was only tracked by JMA and PAGASA

Pacific typhoon set index articles